Sisomphone Lovansay (7 July 1916 – 24 February 1993) was a Tai Dam politician and member of the Lao People's Revolutionary Party (LPRP). He served as Vice President of the People's Supreme Court.

He was elected to the LPP Central Committee at the 1st National Congress and retained a seat on the body until the 5th National Congress.

References

Specific

Bibliography
Books:
 

1916 births
1993 deaths
Members of the 1st Central Committee of the Lao People's Party
Members of the 2nd Central Committee of the Lao People's Revolutionary Party
Members of the 3rd Central Committee of the Lao People's Revolutionary Party
Members of the 4th Central Committee of the Lao People's Revolutionary Party
Members of the 2nd Secretariat of the Lao People's Revolutionary Party
Members of the 3rd Secretariat of the Lao People's Revolutionary Party
Members of the 2nd Politburo of the Lao People's Revolutionary Party
Members of the 3rd Politburo of the Lao People's Revolutionary Party
Members of the 4th Politburo of the Lao People's Revolutionary Party
Government ministers of Laos
Lao People's Revolutionary Party politicians
Place of birth missing
People from Ratanakiri province